Cornelius (some sources Gelasius) Ó Bánáin, Abbot of Clones, was a bishop in Ireland during the early 14th century:  he was Bishop of Clogher  from 1316 until his death in 1319.

References

14th-century Roman Catholic bishops in Ireland
Pre-Reformation bishops of Clogher
1319 deaths
14th-century Irish abbots